WTSN (1270 kHz) is a commercial AM radio station licensed to Dover, New Hampshire, and serving the Seacoast Region of New Hampshire and Southern Maine. WTSN airs a news/talk radio format.  It broadcasts with 5,000 watts of power from a transmitter on Back Road in Dover.

WTSN is simulcast locally on an FM translator at 98.1, W251CF, and regionally on WTPL 107.7 in Manchester and WEMJ in the Lakes Region.  The station identifies itself using its FM frequency, "News Talk 98.1 WTSN."

Programming
WTSN carries local and syndicated talk programming.  The station began carrying the Boston-based Howie Carr Show in late afternoons on February 16, 2015. Mike Pomp hosts the award-winning Morning Information Center and Open Mic Show.

WTSN features local news updates throughout the day, business updates from CNBC Business Radio in addition to ABC News Radio updates. WTSN is the New Hampshire/Maine Seacoast home of the Boston Red Sox, the Boston Celtics and the Boston Bruins.

History

WTSN first signed on in 1956. The call sign was chosen because the original owner was the Twin State Network, which owned radio stations in both New Hampshire and Vermont.

In August 2015 WTSN and its sister station WBYY announced plans to join with Aruba Capital Holdings's WXEX and Port Broadcasting's WNBP and WWSF to form Coastal Media Partners, with Port Broadcasting management assuming immediate oversight of WTSN and WBYY. The merger failed to close, and in April 2016 WTSN and WBYY were sold to Binnie Media for $2.1 million. The sale officially closed on September 29, 2016.

WTSN began a simulcast using an FM translator on 98.1 MHz (W251CF) in November 2016.

Translators

Honors
WTSN was named the New Hampshire AM Radio Station of the year in 2006 by The New Hampshire Association of Broadcasters.  WTSN was named the 2007 New Hampshire Radio Station of the year by the same broadcast organization. Mike Pomp was named the "Radio Personality of the Year" in 2016 by the New Hampshire Association of Broadcasters. He previously won in 2012, and was NH Broadcaster of the Year in 2009.

References

External links

TSN (AM)
News and talk radio stations in the United States
Dover, New Hampshire
Radio stations established in 1956
1956 establishments in New Hampshire